The 2001 Shanghai Sevens was an international rugby sevens tournament that was held in Shanghai, China as the fifth leg of the 2000–01 World Sevens Series. It was the first China Sevens tournament to be hosted as part of  the World Sevens Series, and the event took place at the Yuanshen Stadium on 8–9 April 2001.

Australia won the Shanghai Sevens after they defeated South Africa 19–12 to go to second place in the overall standings.

Format
The teams were drawn into four pools of four teams each. Each team played the other teams in their pool once, with 3 points awarded for a win, 2 points for a draw, and 1 point for a loss (no points awarded for a forfeit). The pool stage was played on the first day of the tournament. The top two teams from each pool advanced to the Cup/Plate brackets. The bottom two teams from each group went to the Bowl/Shield brackets.

Teams
The 16 participating teams for the tournament:

Pool stage
The pool stage was played on the first day of the tournament. The 16 teams were separated into four pools of four teams and teams in the same pool played each other once. The top two teams in each pool advanced to the Cup quarterfinals to compete for the 2001 Shanghai Sevens title.

Pool A

Source: World Rugby

Pool B

Source: World Rugby

Pool C

Source: World Rugby

Pool D

Source: World Rugby

Knockout stage

Bowl

Source: World Rugby

Plate

Source: World Rugby

Cup

Source: World Rugby

Tournament placings

Source: Rugby7.com

Series standings
At the completion of Round 5:

Source: Rugby7.com

References

2000–01 IRB Sevens World Series
2001 in Chinese sport